Ridgecrest is a city in Kern County, California, United States, along U.S. Route 395 in the Indian Wells Valley in northeastern Kern County, adjacent to the Naval Air Weapons Station China Lake (NAWS, or China Lake). It was incorporated as a city in 1963. The population was 27,959 at the 2020 census, up slightly from 27,616 at the 2010 census.

Ridgecrest is surrounded by four mountain ranges; the Sierra Nevada on the west, the Cosos on the north, the Argus Range on the east, and the El Paso Mountains on the south. Private air travel in and out of the city is provided through the Inyokern Airport. There are currently no scheduled commercial flights.

The city has been near the epicenter of major earthquakes, including one in 1995 and a series of quakes in July 2019.

History
The settlement began as a farming community called Crumville in 1912, honoring James and Robert Crum, local dairymen. The first post office opened in 1941. By 1943, Ridgecrest had grown to 115 homes and 196 residents. NOTS (Naval Ordnance Test Station) was established in November 1943, providing a strong job base for the years to come.

Ridgecrest incorporated in 1963. During this era the growth of Ridgecrest was governed by the continuing needs of the high tech industries coupled to the Naval Air Weapons Station (NAWS) programs for testing arms and guidance systems.

Geography

Ridgecrest is located in Indian Wells Valley, which is a southern extension of Owens Valley, broken up by the volcanic Coso Range.

1995 earthquake
The area, associated with the Eastern California Shear Zone, has in the past experienced numerous earthquake swarms, groups of several thousand quakes under magnitude 6.0 or so, often with no obvious mainshock. Then, on September 20, 1995, the second large quake struck the area: it measured magnitude 5.8, and was at that time the largest earthquake to hit southern California since the 1994 Northridge earthquake.

2019 earthquakes

On July 4–5, 2019, Ridgecrest was associated with a series of earthquakes, including the largest to affect the area in decades, measuring 7.1 magnitude. The epicenter was about 10 miles northeast of Ridgecrest. Over 1,400 aftershocks struck Searles Valley and Ridgecrest. On July 5, 2019, at 8:19 P.M., the magnitude 7.1 earthquake occurred, with the epicenter approximately 10 miles northeast of Ridgecrest.

Climate

The weather in the Indian Wells Valley is predominantly influenced by its high desert location. The climate is characterized by hot days and cool nights with extremely arid conditions prevailing throughout the summer months.

Demographics

2010
The 2010 United States Census reported that Ridgecrest had a population of 27,616. The racial makeup of Ridgecrest was 21,387 (77.4%) White, 1,113 (4.0%) African American, 341 (1.2%) Native American, 1,209 (4.4%) Asian, 143 (0.5%) Pacific Islander, 1,836 (6.6%) from other races, and 1,587 (5.7%) from two or more races. Hispanic or Latino of any race were 4,941 persons (17.9%).

The Census reported that 27,420 people (99.3% of the population) lived in households, 109 (0.4%) lived in non-institutionalized group quarters, and 87 (0.3%) were institutionalized.

There were 10,781 households, out of which 3,901 (36.2%) had children under the age of 18 living in them, 5,211 (48.3%) were opposite-sex married couples living together, 1,352 (12.5%) had a female householder with no husband present, 609 (5.6%) had a male householder with no wife present. There were 681 (6.3%) unmarried opposite-sex partnerships, and 64 (0.6%) same-sex married couples or partnerships. 2,978 households (27.6%) were made up of individuals, and 1,001 (9.3%) had someone living alone who was 65 years of age or older. The average household size was 2.54. There were 7,172 families (66.5% of all households); the average family size was 3.10.

The population was spread out, with 7,544 people (27.3%) under the age of 18, 2,654 people (9.6%) aged 18 to 24, 7,157 people (25.9%) aged 25 to 44, 6,844 people (24.8%) aged 45 to 64, and 3,417 people (12.4%) who were 65 years of age or older. The median age was 33.8 years. For every 100 females, there were 100.3 males. For every 100 females age 18 and over, there were 99.9 males.

The homeowner vacancy rate was 2.9%; the rental vacancy rate was 9.2%. 16,520 people (59.8% of the population) lived in owner-occupied housing units and 10,900 people (39.5%) lived in rental housing units.

2000

According to the census of 2000, there were 24,927 people, 9,826 households, and 6,691 families residing in the city. The racial makeup of the city was 82.02% White, 3.53% Black or African American, 1.08% Native American, 3.88% Asian, 0.58% Pacific Islander, 4.93% from other races, and 3.98% from two or more races. 12.04% of the population were Hispanic or Latino of any race.

There were 9,826 households, out of which 35.0% had children under the age of 18 living with them, 52.2% were married couples living together, 11.5% had a female householder with no husband present, and 31.9% were non-families. 27.6% of all households were made up of individuals, and 8.6% had someone living alone who was 65 years of age or older. The average household size was 2.51 and the average family size was 3.06.

In the city, the population was spread out, with 29.1% under the age of 18, 8.5% from 18 to 24, 28.1% from 25 to 44, 23.0% from 45 to 64, and 11.3% who were 65 years of age or older. The median age was 36 years. For every 100 females, there were 99.6 males. For every 100 females age 18 and over, there were 97.9 males.

The median income for a household in the city was $44,971, and the median income for a family was $52,725. Males had a median income of $46,993 versus $29,558 for females. The per capita income for the city was $21,312. About 10.2% of families and 12.3% of the population were below the poverty line, including 17.5% of those under age 18 and 5.1% of those age 65 or over.

Crime index: 40.0% safe city
High school or higher: 87.4%
Bachelor's degree or higher: 24.4%
Graduate or professional degree: 8.5%
Unemployed: 6.8%
Mean travel time to work: 14.9 minutes

Never married: 22.1%
Now married: 56.7%
Separated: 2.6%
Widowed: 6.6%
Divorced: 12.1%

Males: 12,924 – (49.9%)
Females: 12,971 – (50.1%)
Median resident age: 35.5 years
California median age: 33.3 years

People in group quarters:
987 people in military barracks, etc.
87 people in nursing homes
33 people in other non-institutional group quarters
22 people in state prisons

Economy
Naval Air Weapons Station China Lake (NAWS China Lake) is an airborne weapons testing and training range located adjacent to Ridgecrest and operated by the United States Navy and its contractors. Naval Air Weapons Station China Lake provides the majority of employment in the city at just under 8,000 jobs in 2018. This includes the government civilian workforce, active duty military personnel and private contractors.

AltaOne Federal Credit Union has its corporate headquarters in Ridgecrest.

The Searles Valley Minerals plant is located adjacent to the Searles Dry Lake near the town of Trona, California, about thirty miles east of Ridgecrest.

Top employers
The principal employers in Ridgecrest in 2020 were:

Local features and activities

The most notable feature in the nearby area is the Coso People rock art in Big and Little Petroglyph Canyons. The Coso People were prolific artists and traded with distant tribes using tools crafted of stone. Archeological recovery at coastal Chumash sites in California indicates considerable trade with the Coso People.

Other activities in the area are:

Hunting and shooting
Hiking
Horseback riding
Off-roading and dirt biking
Golf
Road cycling
Camping
Flying and gliding

Maturango Museum

The Maturango Museum is located in Ridgecrest. The museum is best known for the guided tours to Little Petroglyph Canyon on China Lake Naval Weapons Station (NAWS). The museum offers exhibits and displays featuring both the natural and the cultural history and diversity of the Northern Mojave Desert with exhibits of plants, animals, Native American artifacts, geology and contemporary arts and crafts.

Coso Rock Art District

Coso Rock Art District, sometimes equated with the Big and Little Petroglyph Canyons is a site containing over 20,000 Native American petroglyphs now located within Naval Air Weapons Station China Lake, near China Lake and Ridgecrest, California. In fact, there are several other distinct canyons to the Coso Rock Art District besides the Big and Little Petroglyph Canyons. The most popular subjects are bighorn sheep, deer, and antelope. Big and Little Petroglyph Canyons were declared a National Historic Landmark in 1964. In 2001, they were incorporated into a larger National Historic Landmark District, called Coso Rock Art District. In 2014, the Ridgecrest Petroglyph Festival, a celebration of the petroglyphs, native culture, and Ridgecrest as a California tourist destination was created as an annual event. It was named as one of Groupon's "10 Most Unique Autumn Festivals in the Country"

Walker Pass

Walker Pass (elevation ) is a mountain pass by Lake Isabella in the southern Sierra Nevada mountains. It is located in northeastern Kern County, approximately  ENE of Bakersfield and  WSW of Ridgecrest. The pass provides a route between the San Joaquin Valley on the west and the Mojave Desert on the east.

Trona Pinnacles

Trona Pinnacles featured in many notable films are located near Ridgecrest.

Red Rock Canyon State Park

Red Rock Canyon State Park is also very close to Ridgecrest and provides the community with hiking and camping opportunities.

Education

Sierra Sands Unified School District, which serves the city of Ridgecrest, Inyokern, and the surrounding communities, includes the following elementary schools: Las Flores Elementary, Faller Elementary, Richmond Elementary currently displaced to Vieweg Elementary due to damage in recent earthquakes, Gateway Elementary, Pierce Elementary, and Inyokern Elementary. For middle-schoolers the school district includes James Monroe Middle School, and Murray Middle School. The district's primary high school, Sherman E Burroughs High School, serves Ridgecrest, China Lake NAWC, Inyokern, Buttermilk Acres, Red Mountain, and Randsburg. There is also an alternative high school, Mesquite High School.
Ridgecrest Elementary Academy for Language, Music, and Science (REALMS)is a public charter school sponsored by the Kern County Office of Education. Opened in 2019, the school educates children from Transitional K to the 6th grade. The school campus was formerly a Transitional K to 8th grade school which operated from 2001 to 2018 under the name Ridgecrest Charter School.

College

Cerro Coso Community College, a part of the Kern Community College District, was established in 1973 and has a full-time enrollment of 2,347. The  Indian Wells Valley Campus (IWV) is located in the upper Mojave Desert near Ridgecrest. The IWV Campus is the largest of the Cerro Coso campuses. It serves a population of about 50,000. The college serves the communities of Ridgecrest, China Lake, Inyokern, and Trona.

Public library
Ridgecrest Branch Library, a branch of the Kern County Library, serves Ridgecrest, Inyokern, China Lake, Trona and surrounding communities.

Public safety

Ridgecrest has its own police department, as well as a regional station of the Kern County Sheriff's Department. The Kern County Fire Department provides fire protection and emergency medical services. Full-time law enforcement employees in 2008 numbered 56 (41 officers).

Crime statistics for 2011 (reported by the Ridgecrest Police Department):

Homicide: 1
Manslaughter by negligence: 0
Robbery: 15
Rape: 11
Assault: 337
Burglary: 192
Theft: 292
Auto theft: 37
Arson: 14
Total violent crimes: 364
Total property crimes: 535
Total crimes: 899
Percentage change since prior period: -9%
Calls for service: 33,440

Notable people
Notable natives include:
Rebekka Armstrong, Playboy Playmate and HIV/AIDS activist
Ted Bachman, former American football defensive end, attended Burroughs High.
Lacy Barnes-Mileham, (b. 1964), graduated Burroughs High (1983) and Fresno State (1988). Won U.S.A. Track and Field discus championships in 1999 and 1991, and competed in the 1996 Atlanta Olympics.
Jerome Davis (sprinter), sprinter
Mark Hoppus, co-lead singer and bassist of the rock band Blink-182
Jason Monks, politician and member of the Idaho House of Representatives
Sabaa Tahir, author

Media

Ridgecrest has one TV station, KZGN-LD, owned by Wiknich Broadcasting Corp., that has 3 channels serving the entire Indian Wells Valley over the air and on Mediacom Cable. KZGN provides local news, weather and sports. KZGN also provides a daily local interview program, Ridgecrest Talk. Ridgecrest is served by two newspapers, The Daily Independent and the News Review, as well as a mixture of local broadcast stations and repeaters from radio and TV stations based in Los Angeles and Bakersfield. The repeaters are operated by the IWV TV Booster. Radio stations in the area include KRSF 89.3 a Christian radio format with Radio 74; KZFX 93.7 a classic rock format with ABC and California news and weather; KSSI (FM) 102.7, broadcasting rock music, local news and weather; KLOA (AM) 1240, broadcasting CBS Sports Radio; KZIQ 92.7, featuring adult contemporary music; KRAJ The Heat 100.9 FM, featuring a hip-hop format; and K296AI the 107.1, with KCNV classical music feed. KRCK-1360, "Ridgecrest Radio", went off the air in the 1970s. TV repeater K05FO 5 rebroadcasts KTLA; and K35HO-D 35 rebroadcasts KBAK.

In popular culture 
The town of Junktown in the video game Fallout is based on a post-apocalyptic version of Ridgecrest.

In the following 1984 Sony commercial, Ridgecrest is known as the "Earthquake Capital of the World..."
Sony - No More Shakes

Transportation 
Ridgecrest is located at the junction of highways California State Route 178 and U.S. Route 395 (business route).

The City of Ridgecrest provides the Ridgecrest Transit shuttle bus service to and from Inyokern, connecting with the Eastern Sierra Transit Authority bus that serves Bishop and Mammoth Lakes to the north, and Lancaster (Metrolink station), with connections for Los Angeles, to the south. Kern Transit connects Ridgecrest to Lake Isabella and Mojave.

See also
Ridgecrest Regional Hospital
Naval Air Weapons Station China Lake

References

External links

 
 City-data.com: Ridgecrest, California
 USGS.gov: Recent Earthquakes in Ridgecrest, California

 
Cities in Kern County, California
Cities in the Mojave Desert
Populated places established in 1912
1912 establishments in California
Incorporated cities and towns in California